"Private Eye" is a song by the Chicago-based punk rock band Alkaline Trio, released as the second single from their 2001 album From Here to Infirmary. Two different versions of the single were released in the United Kingdom, where it reached #50 on the UK Singles chart.
 on the UK Singles Chart

The song's music video is compiled from live footage of the band performing "Private Eye" on several dates of their 2000 tour, with touring drummer Adam Willard filling in following Mike Felumlee's departure from the group.

Track listing

The data portion of the enhanced CD consists of the music video for "Stupid Kid".

Personnel

Band
Matt Skiba – guitar, lead vocals
Dan Andriano – bass, backing vocals
Mike Felumlee – drums on "Private Eye"
Adam Willard – drums on "Mr. Chainsaw" and "Cringe"

Production
Matt Allison – producer on "Private Eye"
Neil Weir – assistant producer on "Private Eye"
Jerry Finn – mix engineer on "Private Eye"

References 

Alkaline Trio songs
2001 singles
Vagrant Records singles
2001 songs
Songs written by Matt Skiba
Songs written by Dan Andriano
Songs written by Mike Felumlee